Schwarzheide is a town in the Oberspreewald-Lausitz district, in Lower Lusatia, Brandenburg, Germany. It is situated on the river Schwarze Elster, 11 km southwest of Senftenberg, 110 km south of Berlin and 40 km north of Dresden. The little river Pössnitz runs through the eastern part of Schwarzheide.

Neighbouring communities 
Immediate neighbors of the town are the towns Ruhland (south), Lauchhammer (west), Schipkau (north) and Senftenberg with the district Brieske (east).

Districts 
Schwarzheide has the following districts

 Schwarzheide-West (former Zschornegosda)
 Wandelhof
 Schwarzheide-Mitte
 Schwarzheide-Ost, consisting of Victoria and Naundorf

History 
The town's landmark is the watertower.  Today´s industrial town, Schwarzheide, was created on October 1, 1936, from the independent communities, Zschornegosda (today Schwarzheide-West) and Naundorf (now part of Schwarzheide-Ost). The name was translated from the Sorbian name, "Zschornegosda", (corny = black, gozd = heath, wood).
The date of foundation of this community is unknown. Zschornegosda and Naundorf were founded in the 12th or the 13th century after the Christianization of the Sorbs.

The first written evidence of Naundorf (as Nuwendorff) came from a pledge deed from 1421. Zschornegosda was first written in 1449 (as Cschörnegast) in feudal deed of Duke Frederick II, Elector of Saxony. Naundorf is a typical  street village. Zschornegosda is a rotunde called okolnica. The chapel was on the highest point of a sandy knoll.

The development of both villages was retarded by wars, fires, and epidemics. Until the 18th century, the villages had no more than 100 inhabitants.

In 1780, the discovery of lignite coal west of Zschornegosda in Bockwitz lead to mining and the foundation of briquette factories (Ferdinand, Victoria, Victoria II). The river, Schwarze Elster, was drained and converted to a canal, so it was no longer possible to live from fishing. Highway A13 was built in 1936.

World War II In 1937, Brabag completed the Brabag II facility in Ruhland-Schwarlheide (the 4th Nazi Germany Fischer-Tropsch plant) to produce gasoline and diesel fuel from lignite coal.  The plant was a target of the Oil Campaign of World War II, used Sachsenhausen concentration camp forced labor, and became a post-war Soviet Joint Stock Company.  The factory became VEB Synthesewerk Schwarzheide on January 1, 1954.

When the village's population reached eight-thousand inhabitants, the village became a town on January 11, 1967.

After 1990, Synthesewerk Schwarzheide became a part of BASF AG, which manufactures polyurethane.

Political affinity 
The river, Schwarze Elster, forms the border between lower and upper Lusatia.
From 1635, both Zschornegosda and Naundorf were part of the Electorate of Saxony. In 1815 both villages came to Prussia because of the Congress of Vienna. From 1815 to 1947, they were part of the Prussian Province of Brandenburg.
Between 1818 and 1952, Zschornegosda and Naundorf were part of Kreis Calau.
From 1952 to 1990, Schwarzheide was a part of Kreis Senftenberg in the Bezirk Cottbus of East Germany.

In 1990, town was annexed to Brandenburg, and, on December 6, 1993, to Oberspreewald-Lausitz.

Parliament 
The town parliament of Schwarzheide comprises the mayor and 18 members.
Christian Democratic Union 5 seats (27.3%)
Freie Wählergruppe Schwarzheide 4 seats (22.3%)
Social Democratic Party 3 seats (18.2%)
The Left 3 seats (17.0%)
Free Democratic Party 3 seats (15.2%)

The turnout stood at 56,9 percent.

Partnerships 
 Krosno Odrzańskie (Poland)
 Karcag (Hungary)
 Piano di Sorrento (Italy)

Demography

Culture and art 

Symbol is the 36 m high water tower built in 1943/44 by French prisoners of war. Lutherkirche from 1754 is also located in the center. The oldest nightclub in eastern Germany is Freizeitpark Wandelhof and there is also a cinema with four sals and 650 places.

Museums 
Kulturhaus of BASF (Schipkauer Straße)
Museum of Schwarzheide (Dorfaue)

Historical monuments
 Memorial for the victims of the concentration camp
 Monument from 1965 on cemetery Schwarzheide-West for more than 23 unfree workers Brabagvictims

Buildings 
 Evangelical church (1953 first new church in the GDR, Otto-Nuschke-Straße)
  Lutheran church (Schwarzheide)
 Evangelical chapel (Parkstraße)
 Catholic Holy Cross church (Otto-Nuschke-Straße)

Natur and recreation areas 
Pine forests, lakes, meadows, and pastures surround Schwarzheide. The Lusatian Lake District and Spreewald are also near Schwarzheide.

Sports 
Eurospeedway Lausitz is near.

Infrastructure

Transport 
federal highway 13 Bundesautobahn 13 from Berlin to Dresden, in south B 169. There is a rail way point in Schwarzheide-Ost.

Street 
A 13 (E 55): Berlin–Dresden (Anschlussstelle (16) Schwarzheide and Anschlussstelle (17) Ruhland)

Railway 
RE 18: Falkenberg (Elster)–Bad Liebenwerda–Lauchhammer–Ruhland–Schwarzheide-Ost–Senftenberg–Drebkau–Cottbus

Companies 
The largest employer is BASF Schwarzheide GmbH, and the company is building a battery supply plant. Other companies include Fränkische Rohrwerke and PeinigerRöRo.

Media 
 Local  broadcasting Schwarzheide & Ruhland

Education 
In Schwarzheide exist a secondary school (Schwarzheide-Wandelhof), a high school (Emil-Fischer), a division of Oberstufenzentrums Lausitz (OSZ) to train laboratory technicians and chemistss, and a music school.

Important persons

Honored 

 2002: Hans-Herman Dehmel (chief executive officer of BASF Schwarzheide from 1990 to 1995)
 2004: Sokratis Giapapas (chief of Fränkisch Rohrwerke in Schwarzheide)

External links 
 Internetseite der Stadt Schwarzheide

Notes 

Populated places in Oberspreewald-Lausitz
Oil campaign of World War II